North Columbia Fire Station No. 7 is a historic fire station located at Columbia, South Carolina. It was built in 1948, and is a two-story, brick, transitional Art Moderne / International style building.  It features metal window frames, flat roof, and corner ribbon windows.

It was added to the National Register of Historic Places in 2005.

References

Fire stations completed in 1948
Fire stations on the National Register of Historic Places in South Carolina
Buildings and structures in Columbia, South Carolina
National Register of Historic Places in Columbia, South Carolina
1948 establishments in South Carolina